Warwick Nash (also William Nash; 29 June 1907 – 1983), was an Irish chess player, Irish Correspondence Chess Championship winner (1964).

Biography
In the end of 1930s to the begin of 1960s Warwick Nash was one of the strongest Irish chess players. He eleven times participated in Irish Chess Championships: 1940, 1946, 1947, 1948, 1949, 1950, 1951, 1952, 1953, 1960, and 1961.

Warwick Nash played for Ireland in the Chess Olympiads:
 In 1939, at first reserve board in the 8th Chess Olympiad in Buenos Aires (+1, =5, -7),
 In 1954, at first reserve board in the 11th Chess Olympiad in Amsterdam (+0, =2, -10),
 In 1960, at fourth board in the 14th Chess Olympiad in Leipzig (+2, =2, -7).

Also Warwick Nash participated in correspondence chess tournament. In 1936, 1940, 1964, he won Irish Correspondence Chess Championship.

Warwick was also the brother of the noted Irish doctor John Nash.

References

External links

Warwick Nash chess games at 365chess.com

1907 births
1983 deaths
People from Athlone
Irish chess players
Chess Olympiad competitors
20th-century chess players